Mohammad Mehdi Esmaili born in 1975, Hamedan, is the Minister of Culture of Iran.

References

1975 births
Living people
People from Hamadan Province
Government ministers of Iran
Culture ministers of Iran